Vathy (Greek: Βαθύ), also Vathi may refer to numerous places throughout Greece:

Vathy, Aegina, a village in the Attica regional unit
Vathi, Athens, a neighbourhood in the city of Athens, Attica
Vathy, Euboea, a village in the municipality Chalcis, Euboea, Central Greece
Vathy, Ithaca, a capital of the island of Ithaca, Ionian Islands
Vathy, Methana, a village in Methana, Islands regional unit, Attica
Vathy, Meganisi, a village in the municipality Meganisi, Lefkada regional unit, Ionian Islands
Vathy, Preveza, a village in the municipality Ziros, Preveza regional unit, Epirus; see 
Vathy, Samos, a town in the municipality Samos, North Aegean
Vathy, Apollonia, a village in the municipality Sifnos, Milos regional unit, South Aegean

See also
Vathys, a village and valley in the municipality Kalymnos, Kalymnos regional unit, South Aegean
Vathia (Laconia), Greece, a village in the municipality East Mani, Laconia, Peloponnese